Yumiko Kayukawa(born 1970) is a Japanese visual artist, currently based in Seattle, known for fantastical paintings that utilize flat color and decorative graphic elements in works that combine female figures with animals, mythical beings and natural elements.

Early life and education
Yumiko Kayukawa was born in the town of Naie on the island of Hokkaido, Japan. Kayukawa attended Bisen Art School in Sapporo. She moved to Seattle, Washington in 2005.

Work 
Kayukawa's work combines traditional Japanese themes with motifs from American fashion and music culture. Shinto animism combines with Rock and Roll inspirations.

Selected exhibitions
Kayukawa's solo exhibitions include Year Of The Fire Horse at Foley Gallery, New York, NY in 2014, “HAKURYUU – White Dragon” at LeBasse projects, Culver City, CA in 2012,

References

External links

Living people
1970 births
Japanese painters
20th-century Japanese women artists
21st-century Japanese women artists
American contemporary painters
Japanese contemporary artists